Eulepidotis mesomphala is a moth of the family Erebidae first described by George Hampson in 1926. It is found in the Neotropics, including the Brazilian states of Amazonas and Pará.

References

Moths described in 1926
mesomphala